Visitors to East Timor must obtain a visa unless they come from one of the visa exempt countries.

In accordance with the law, citizens of all countries except Indonesia, Cape Verde, and the Schengen Area must obtain a visa upon arrival or prior to arrival.

In April 2019, the Interior Minister adopted an Order number 470 to be applied from 1 May 2019, requiring all non-visa-exempt visitors to obtain a visa from one of the East Timor diplomatic missions before arrival. However, this decision was subsequently suspended.

Visa policy map

Visa exemption
: Timor-Leste signed a mutual visa-waiver agreement with Cape Verde on 21 July 2014 and entered into force on 14 April 2015. This agreement allows citizens of the respective countries to stay up to 30 days without a visa.
: Timor-Leste signed a mutual visa-waiver agreement with the European Union on 28 May 2015 which was applied on a provisional basis as from the date of signature and ratified on 15 December 2015. This agreement allows all citizens of states that are contracting parties to the Schengen Agreement to stay without a visa for a maximum period of 90 days in any 180-day period.
: Timor Leste implemented a visa-free policy towards Indonesian citizens on 19 September 2019. This allows Indonesian citizens to visit Timor-Leste for 30 days, with an option to extend their stay once by the same period.

There is also a visa exemption for holders of diplomatic or service passports of Australia and China.

Land border arrivals
All visitors who need a visa arriving at a land border post must apply in advance for a Visa Application Authorization which is then presented to an immigration official at the border. If other conditions are met a single or multiple entry visa valid for up to 90 days is granted for a fee of US$30. Visitors which are exempt from a visa (such as citizens from a Schengen country) do not need a visa (and hence no Visa Application Authorization) at any land border crossing.

Visa on arrival
Visitors may apply for visa on arrival at the Presidente Nicolau Lobato International Airport or at the Dili Sea Port. If other conditions are met a single entry visa valid for up to 30 days is granted for a fee of US$30. Transit visas are available for stays less than 3 days for a fee of US$20. There is no transit without a visa option in East Timor.

Prior application
A visa application may be submitted at one of the East Timor diplomatic missions prior to arrival.

Requirements on arrival
Aside from holding a passport valid for not less than 6 months from the date of entry all travellers also must meet strict conditions to be allowed entry to East Timor:

Intention of a genuine visit (as tourist or business trip).
Accommodation arrangements and a return or onward ticket.
US$150 per day expected to remain in the country (for tourist or business visas).
US$100 plus US$50 per day (for transit visas).

Visa extension
All nationals with a visa may extend their stay to a total cumulative stay of 90 days by submitting their application to the Immigration Department. The fees are US$35 for a 30-day extension, or US$75 for an extension between 30 and 60 days.

Statistics
Most visitors arriving to East Timor by air were from the following countries of nationality:

See also

Visa requirements for East Timorese citizens

References

 

East Timor
Foreign relations of East Timor